Jameel Jalibi (Urdu: جمیل جالبی)  was a noted linguist, critic, writer, and scholar of Urdu literature and linguistics from Pakistan. He also was Vice-Chancellor at the University of Karachi.

Early life 
Jameel Jalibi was born Mohammad Jameel Khan on 12 June 1929 in a Yusufzai family of Aligarh, British India. His early schooling was in Aligarh. He matriculated in Saharanpur and did his Bachelor of Arts from Meerut College. One day before the partition of India, on 13 August 1947, Jalibi migrated to Karachi, Pakistan, where he continued his education and literary activities. He received Master of Arts in English (1949), Bachelor of Laws (1950), Ph.D (1971), and DLitt (1973) from Sindh University. 

Between 1950 and 1953 he served as headmaster at Bahadur Yar Jang School, Karachi.

In 1953, he passed Central Superior Services exams and joined Pakistan's Income Tax Department until his retirement.

Career and Literary Work 
In 1983, Jalibi became Vice-chancellor of Karachi University, where he served until 1987. Then he joined the Muqtadara Quami Zaban (National Language Authority) as its Chairman. 

In 1949, Jalibi worked as assistant editor for about six months for Payam-i-Mashriq, an Urdu weekly published in Karachi. From 1950-54, he served as co-editor of an Urdu monthly by the name of Saqi and wrote a monthly column Baatein. He also started a quarterly magazine by the name of Naya Daur.

He performed extensive research on the history of Urdu literature and penned five chronicle volumes with the title Tareekh-e-Adab-e-Urdu, covering 15-20 centuries.

Jalibi authored over 40 books on criticism, research and culture. He also wrote short stories for children.

Awards and recognition
Hilal-e-Imtiaz (Crescent of Distinction) Award in 1994 by the President of Pakistan
Sitara-e-Imtiaz (Star of Distinction) Award by the President of Pakistan
Baba-i-Urdu Maulvi Abdul Haq Award (National Literary Award) given by Pakistan Academy of Letters in 2006.
Nishan-e-Imtiaz (Order of Excellence) by the President of Pakistan in 2021

Pakistan Academy of Letters published a special number on his literary achievements Dr Jameel Jalibi: Shakhsiat aur Fun.

The Chief Minister of Sindh inaugurated Dr Jameel Jalibi Research Library on 14 August 2021 and also announced Dr Jameel Jalibi Chair at the University of Karachi in recognition of Jalibi’s contribution to the Urdu language.

Death
He died on 18 April 2019 in Karachi, Pakistan. Among his survivors are his four children  two daughters and two sons.

Publications 
 Pakistani Culture
 Tanqeed aur Tajarba (Criticism and Experience)
 Nai Tanqeed (New Criticism)
 Adab, Culture aur Masa'el (Literature, Culture and Problems)
 Muhammad Taqi Meer
 Noon Meem Rashid: aik mutal’a (1986)
 Maasir-e-Adab (Contemporaries Of Literature)
 Quami Zaban (National Language)
 Yak-Jehti Nafaz aur Masa'el (Solidarity Of Self and Problems)
 Masnavi Kadam Rao aur Pidam Rao
 Diwan-e-Hasan Shauqi (Collection of Hasan Sahuqi's Poetry)
 Farhang-e-Istalahaat (Dictionary of Terms)
 Qadeem Urdu Lughat (Ancient Urdu Dictionary)
 Tareekh-e-Adab-e-Urdu (History of Urdu Literature)
 Diwan-e-Nusrati (Collection of Nusrati's Poetry)
 Elliot ke Mazameen (Essays of Elliot)
 Pakistan: The Identity Of Culture
 Janwarsitan (Animal Land)
 Arastoo Se Elliot Tak (From Aristotle to Elliot)
 Adabi Tehqique
 Qaumi English-Urdu Dictionary (1995)
 Tareekh-e-Adab-e-Urdu Vol 1-5 (History of Urdu Language and Literature)

References

1929 births
2019 deaths
People from Aligarh
People from Karachi
Pashtun people
Pakistani literary critics
Urdu-language writers
Linguists of Urdu
Urdu critics
Pakistani scholars
University of Karachi alumni
Recipients of Nishan-e-Imtiaz
Recipients of Hilal-i-Imtiaz
Recipients of Sitara-i-Imtiaz
Vice-Chancellors of the University of Karachi
Writers from Karachi
Pakistani lexicographers
Academics from Karachi
Academic staff of the University of Karachi